Quinton Vega (born 22 November 1992) is an American tennis player.

Vega has a career high ATP singles ranking of 980 achieved on 7 November 2016. He also has a career high ATP doubles ranking of 736 achieved on 27 June 2016.

Vega represents Puerto Rico at the Davis Cup, where he has a W/L record of 4–1.

References

External links

1992 births
Living people
American male tennis players
Puerto Rican male tennis players
Sportspeople from Brooklyn
Tennis people from New York (state)
Wisconsin Badgers men's tennis players